Paul William McGahan (born 12 October 1964) is a former New Zealand rugby union player. A halfback, McGahan represented Counties and North Harbour at a provincial level and was a member of the New Zealand national side, the All Blacks, in 1990 and 1991. He played six matches for the All Blacks but did not gain a test cap.

References

1964 births
Living people
Rugby union scrum-halves
New Zealand rugby union players
Counties Manukau rugby union players
North Harbour rugby union players
New Zealand international rugby union players
New Zealand expatriate sportspeople in Japan
Expatriate rugby union players in Japan
Rugby union players from the Auckland Region